Morel is a French surname.

Geographical distribution
As of 2014, 51.3% of all known bearers of the surname Morel were residents of France (frequency 1:719), 13.1% of Paraguay (1:306), 11.5% of the Dominican Republic (1:505), 7.4% of Argentina (1:3,188), 4.4% of the United States (1:45,440), 2.4% of Canada (1:8,346), 1.3% of Switzerland (1:3,389), 1.1% of Brazil (1:102,307) and 1.1% of Honduras (1:4,484).

In France, the frequency of the surname was higher than national average (1:719) in the following regions:
 1. Réunion (1:180)
 2. Auvergne-Rhône-Alpes (1:389)
 3. Normandy (1:408)
 4. Bourgogne-Franche-Comté (1:414)
 5. Brittany (1:479)
 6. Saint Pierre and Miquelon (1:582)
 7. Hauts-de-France (1:586)
 8. French Guiana (1:677)

In Paraguay, the frequency of the surname was higher than national average (1:306) in the following departments:
 1. Caazapá Department (1:158)
 2. Paraguarí Department (1:182)
 3. San Pedro Department (1:192)
 4. Canindeyú Department (1:249)
 5. Amambay Department (1:263)

People
 Alfred Morel-Fatio (1850–1924), French hispanist
 Antoine Léon Morel-Fatio (1810–1871), French painter
 Bénédict Morel (1809–1873), Austrian-French psychiatrist
 Brent Morel (born 1987), American major league baseball player
 Cecilia Morel (born 1954), Chilean First Lady, wife of President Sebastián Piñera Echenique
 Charlotte Morel (born 1972), professional French triathlete
 Christopher Morel (born 1999), Dominican baseball player
 Claudio Marcelo Morel Rodríguez, Paraguayan footballer
 Clément Morel (born 1984), French tennis player
 Clement or Clemens Morel (fl. 1534–1552), (probably a single) French composer
 Edmund Dene Morel (1873–1924), Franco-British journalist and politician
 Edmund Morel (1840–1871), English-born railway engineer
 François Morel (1926–2018), Canadian composer, pianist, conductor and music educator
 François Morel (born 1959), French actor and filmmaker
 Gaël Morel (born 1972), French film director
 Guillaume Morel (1505–1564), French classical scholar
 Guy Morel (1933–2006), Seychellois businessman
 Jean Baptiste Morel (1662–1732), Flemish painter
 Jean-Baptiste Morel (1854–1927), French politician 
 Jérémy Morel (born 1984), French footballer
 Jorge Morel (born 1931), Argentine classical guitarist and composer
 Juan Morel Campos (1857–1896), Puerto Rican composer
 Léonard Morel-Ladeuil (1820–1888), French goldsmith and sculptor
 Marie-Rose Morel (1972–2011), Belgian politician
 Olivier Morel de La Durantaye (1640–1716), colonial officer in New France
 Pierre Morel (born 1964), French cinematographer and film director
 Richard Morel (fl. 1995– ), American singer, songwriter, remixer and record producer
 Salomon Morel (1919–2007), Polish-Jewish commander of the Zgoda concentration camp in Świętochłowice
 Sophie Morel (born 1979), French mathematician
 Thierry Morel, French art historian and curator
 Yoryi Morel (1906–1979), painter from the Dominican Republic

See also
 Morell (name)

References

French-language surnames
Surnames of French origin
Surnames from given names